Big Spring Union Church, also known as Big Springs Primitive Baptist Church, is a historic church in Springdale, Claiborne County, Tennessee.

The church was built circa 1795 or 1796, and was known at first as Big Spring Meetinghouse. A Baptist church was organized at the site in 1800. During the Civil War, it served as a hospital for both Confederate and Union Army troops.

It is one of the oldest church buildings in Tennessee that is still in active use as a church. It was added to the National Register of Historic Places in 1975. The church is on Lone Mountain Road, off Tennessee State Route 32. The Tennessee State Library and Archives holds a copy of the records of Big Spring Primitive Baptist Church for the years 1800 through 1948.

See also
List of the oldest buildings in Tennessee

References

External links
 Big Springs Primitive Baptist Church Cemetery at Find a Grave
 

Baptist churches in Tennessee
Churches on the National Register of Historic Places in Tennessee
Churches completed in 1795
Buildings and structures in Claiborne County, Tennessee
18th-century churches in the United States
National Register of Historic Places in Claiborne County, Tennessee